Zikarsky is a surname. Notable people with the surname include:

Bengt Zikarsky (born 1967), German swimmer
Björn Zikarsky (born 1967), German swimmer, twin brother of Bengt